Al-Jirdami, is a Mahallah (Country subdivision) located in Hazm Al Udayn District, Ibb Governorate, Yemen. According to the 2004 Yemen Census, the population of the village was 53.

As of 2014, the population of the Mahallah reached 71.

References 

 National Information Center, Yemen.
 Comprehensive guide to all regions in Yemen - دليلك الشامل إلي اليمن، كل مناطقها.

Populated places in Ibb Governorate